Li Jian (born 19 September 1985 in China) is a former Chinese-born Hong Kong professional footballer who played as a goalkeeper.

Career statistics

Club career
As of 11 September 2009

External links
 Li Jian at HKFA
 Player Information on tswpegasus.com

1985 births
Living people
Chinese footballers
Footballers from Guangdong
Hong Kong footballers
Association football goalkeepers
Hong Kong First Division League players
Expatriate footballers in Hong Kong
Hong Kong Rangers FC players
Kitchee SC players
TSW Pegasus FC players
Chinese expatriate sportspeople in Hong Kong